Buseto Palizzolo (Sicilian: Palazzolu) is a town and comune in North-Western Sicily, Italy, administratively part of the province of Trapani.

Geography
Buseto Palizzolo is  composed of various areas and hamlets, without a main central settlement. The main settlements are Buseto Centro, Badia, Battaglia, Buseto Superiore, and Pianoneve.

History
The comune of Buseto Palizzolo, like those of Valderice, Custonaci and San Vito Lo Capo, were created as a result of the division of the very large comune of Monte San Giuliano during the 1930s.

Municipalities of the Province of Trapani